A Spaceship Built of Stone and Other Stories is a 1987 science fiction short story collection by Lisa Tuttle, her second after A Nest of Nightmares (1985). It was first published by The Women's Press, a specialized feminist publishing company, in their The Women's Press Science Fiction series.

The book contains Lisa Tuttle's Nebula Award winning story "The Bone Flute", a prize she refused.

Contents
 "No Regrets" (1985) short story
 "Wives" (1979) short story 
 "The Family Monkey" (1977) novella
 "Mrs T" (1976) short story (aka Mrs T.) 
 "The Bone Flute" (1981) short story
 "A Spaceship Built of Stone" (1980) short story
 "The Cure" (1984) short story
 "The Hollow Man" (1979) novelette
 "The Other Kind" (1984) novelette
 "The Birds of the Moon" (1979) short story

References
Notes

Bibliography

 Clute, John and Peter Nicholls. The Encyclopedia of Science Fiction. New York: St. Martin's Griffin, 1993 (2nd edition 1995). .

External links
 

1987 short story collections
Science fiction short story collections
British short story collections
American short story collections